1416 Renauxa, provisional designation , is an Eon asteroid from the outer regions of the asteroid belt, approximately 29 kilometers in diameter. It was discovered on 4 March 1937, by French astronomer Louis Boyer at the Algiers Observatory in Algeria, North Africa. It was named after Joseph Renaux, an astronomer at the discovering observatory.

Orbit and classification 

Renauxa is a member the Eos family, the largest asteroid family in the outer main belt consisting of nearly 10,000 asteroids. It orbits the Sun at a distance of 2.7–3.3 AU once every 5 years and 3 months (1,915 days). Its orbit has an eccentricity of 0.11 and an inclination of 10° with respect to the ecliptic.

Physical characteristics 

Renauxa has been characterized as a K-type asteroid, one of the first of such type ever identified and in line with the overall spectral type for members of the Eos family. In the Tholen classification, it is classified as an S-type asteroid. This is a known misclassification as S- and K-types are identical in the visual part of the spectrum.

Rotation period 

In December 2009, a rotational lightcurve of Renauxa was obtained from photometric observations by Richard Durkee at the S.O.S. Observatory. Lightcurve analysis gave a well-defined rotation period of 8.700 hours with a low brightness variation of 0.11 magnitude, superseding previous observation that gave approximately half the period solution. A low brightness amplitude is typical for a spherical rather than elongated shape.

Diameter and albedo 

According to the surveys carried out by the Infrared Astronomical Satellite IRAS, the Japanese Akari satellite and the NEOWISE mission of NASA's Wide-field Infrared Survey Explorer, Renauxa measures between 22.24 and 34.42 kilometers in diameter and its surface has an albedo between 0.09 and 0.212.

The Collaborative Asteroid Lightcurve Link derives an albedo of 0.1122 and a diameter of 28.75 kilometers based on an absolute magnitude of 10.7.

Naming 

This minor planet was named after P. Renaux, a French astronomer and assistant at the discovering Algiers Observatory. The official naming citation was mentioned in The Names of the Minor Planets by Paul Herget in 1955.

Notes

References

External links 
 Asteroid Lightcurve Database (LCDB), query form (info )
 Dictionary of Minor Planet Names, Google books
 Asteroids and comets rotation curves, CdR – Observatoire de Genève, Raoul Behrend
 Discovery Circumstances: Numbered Minor Planets (1)-(5000) – Minor Planet Center
 
 

001416
Discoveries by Louis Boyer (astronomer)
Named minor planets
001416
19370304